Beverly Hills Cop III is a 1994 American action comedy film starring Eddie Murphy and directed by John Landis, who had previously worked with Murphy on Trading Places and Coming to America. It is the third film in the Beverly Hills Cop franchise.

Murphy again plays Detroit cop Axel Foley, who once again returns to Beverly Hills, California, to stop a gang of counterfeiters who are responsible for the death of his boss. Foley teams up with his friend, Beverly Hills detective Billy Rosewood (Judge Reinhold), and his investigation leads him to an amusement park known as Wonder World. The film features a number of cameo appearances by well-known film personalities, including Robert B. Sherman, Arthur Hiller, John Singleton, Joe Dante, Barbet Schroeder, Peter Medak, special effects legend Ray Harryhausen, and George Lucas as a ride patron. It is also the first film in the series not to involve producers Don Simpson and Jerry Bruckheimer, who opted out of the film's production due to budgetary disagreements.

Beverly Hills Cop III was released on May 25, 1994, and grossed $42.6 million in the United States, and $76.5 million at the foreign box office for a worldwide total of $119.2 million. The film received negative reviews from critics, and was considered by them and Murphy himself as the weakest film in the trilogy.

Plot

One night in Detroit, Axel Foley plans to arrest a gang of car thieves who run a local chop shop. Unbeknownst to his superior, Inspector G. Douglas Todd, Axel has canceled the SWAT, intending to raid the shop using only his team. Meanwhile, a group of four men arrive at the chop shop to pick up a cube van that the car thieves had hijacked. The leader of the group confirms that the vehicle still contains its cargo, which consists of crates labeled as property of the U.S. government, then has his men execute the car thieves.

As the murderers are about to leave, Axel, unaware of what has happened inside, proceeds with his plan to enter the shop and quickly finds his team outgunned. Todd, arriving moments later, is killed by the group's leader. When the perpetrators escape in the cube van, Axel gives chase in one of the partially disassembled cars from the shop, but is intercepted by Secret Service Agent Steve Fulbright. Fulbright informs Axel that the killer must remain on the loose because the federal government is pursuing a larger scheme in which he is involved.

After Todd's funeral, Axel learns that several clues left behind by the killers point to Wonder World, a theme park in Beverly Hills, California, owned by "Uncle Dave" Thornton. Axel arrives in Beverly Hills and reunites with his friend Billy Rosewood, who has been promoted to "Deputy Director of Operations for Joint Systems Interdepartmental Operational Command" (DDO-JSIOC), and meets Jon Flint, Billy's new partner after John Taggart's retirement. Flint calls his friend Ellis DeWald, the head of Wonder World's park security, to let him know that Axel is coming to the park for his investigation.

Axel meets and befriends Janice Perkins, a park employee, whilst touring the park's underground behind-the-scenes facilities. He is observed by security, then shot at and attacked hand-to-hand. Axel retreats to the surface, where he cuts in line to enter the Spider Ferris wheel ride. The guards accidentally jam the ride, placing two little children's lives in danger. Axel rescues them and is subsequently taken to park manager Orrin Sanderson. When DeWald is called in to contest the claim that Axel was attacked by the security guards without prior challenge, Axel immediately recognizes DeWald as Todd's killer, but Rosewood and Flint refuse to believe that claim because DeWald is keeping an impeccable public reputation. Later, Axel is visited in his motel room by Uncle Dave and Janice, who inform him that the Wonder World park's designer and Dave's close friend, Roger Frye, has mysteriously disappeared while inspecting the grounds two weeks earlier, leaving only a letter with a cryptic message. Axel and Rosewood attend a banquet roasting DeWald as private law enforcement officer of the year and Axel meets his old friend Serge. The cube van is located at Santa Monica pier, repaired, with a new paint job and abandoned.

Axel tries to heckle DeWald into revealing his criminal involvements, despite continued admonishments by Fulbright, but DeWald proves too smooth to be caught in a mistake. When Axel later digs deeper into a closed-off section of the park, he finds out that DeWald and Sanderson run a counterfeiting ring that uses Wonder World as a front, and DeWald was at the chop shop in Detroit to get his hands on blank printing paper used for American currency. That evening, Axel meets with Uncle Dave to ask him about further details to find a piece of viable evidence, and thereby discovers that Frye's warning letter is actually written on a sheet of the stolen mint paper. Before he can make use of that evidence, however, Uncle Dave is shot by DeWald, and Axel is framed for his shooting.

After getting away from DeWald and bringing Uncle Dave to Willshire Memorial hospital, Axel sets out to prove his innocence by storming the park, calling Rosewood and Flint to assist him. The resulting shootout kills DeWald's henchmen, and after a hand-to-hand fight Axel shoots and kills DeWald, thus avenging Todd. During the fight, Sanderson is shot dead in the print shop by Agent Fulbright, who then appears before Axel to explain that he was right. Axel realizes Fulbright's actual involvement with the counterfeiters and fatally shoots him during a brief struggle. Uncle Dave makes a full recovery, and he thanks Axel for his assistance by creating a new character for Wonder World with his name, Axel Fox; and Janice takes Axel, now in a wheelchair, away from the festivities to show him the 'Tunnel of Love'.

Cast

 Eddie Murphy as Detective Axel Foley
 Judge Reinhold as Sergeant Billy Rosewood
 Hector Elizondo as Detective Jon Flint
 Timothy Carhart as Ellis DeWald
 John Saxon as Orrin Sanderson
 Theresa Randle as Janice Perkins
 Alan Young as Uncle Dave Thornton
 Stephen McHattie as Secret Service Agent Steve Fulbright
 Tracy Melchior as Ticket Booth Lady
 Bronson Pinchot as Serge
 Gil Hill as Inspector Douglas Todd
 Hattie Winston as Mrs. Todd
 Jon Tenney as Detective Levine
 Joey Travolta as Giolito
 Eugene Collier as Leppert
 Lindsey Ginter as Holloway
 Dan Martin as Cooper
 Forry Smith as Rondy
 Gregory McKinney as Kimbrough
 David Parry as Taddeo
 Michael Bowen as Fletch
 Helen Martin as Grandma
 Symba Smith as Annihilator Girl #1
 Julie Strain as Annihilator Girl #2
 Heather Elizabeth Parkhurst as Annihilator Girl #3
 Al Green as Minister
 John Singleton as Fireman
 George Lucas as Disappointed Man
 Arthur Hiller as Bar Patron #1
 Ray Harryhausen as Bar Patron #2
 Robert B. Sherman as Bar Patron #3
 Richard M. Sherman as Wonderworld Bandleader (deleted scenes)

Production

Development and writing
Asked in 1989 about a third installment, Murphy stated: "There's no reason to do it. I don't need the money and it's not gonna break any new ground. How often can you have Axel Foley talk fast and get into a place he doesn't belong? But these motherfuckers are developing scripts for it. They're in pre-production. The only reason to do a Cop III is to beat the bank, and Paramount ain't gonna write me no check as big as I want to do something like that. In fact, if I do a Cop III, you can safely say, 'Ooh, he must have got a lot of money!'"

During the script's early drafts, the plot concerned Foley, Rosewood, and Taggart going to London to rescue Captain Bogomil (Ronny Cox), who was being held hostage by terrorists during an International Police Convention. However, problems such as scripting issues and budgeting caused pre-production to slow to the point where both John Ashton and Ronny Cox had to drop out due to obligations to other film projects. Ashton's part was re-written as John Flint (Héctor Elizondo) and dialogue was inserted to explain that Taggart had retired and moved to Phoenix. Cox's character's absence is never addressed in this film, nor is he mentioned. However, Ashton and Cox make subtle cameos in the form of a picture on Rosewood's desk of Foley, Taggart, Rosewood, and Bogomil on a fishing trip. This is the same picture that appeared in Cop II on Bogomil's and Foley's desks. In an interview in 2012, Ronny Cox said, "They wanted me to be in Beverly Hills Cop III, but...I read the script."

Rejected ideas for Cop III included a Robert Towne screenplay (in which Foley has to deal with his celebrity status), a scenario teaming Murphy with Sean Connery as a Scotland Yard detective, and another Axel-in-London idea where his Scotland Yard counterpart would have been played by John Cleese. The last would have involved British gangsters, loosely based on the real-life Kray brothers, who were captured in Detroit and transported to London by Jeffrey (Axel's friend from Beverly Hills Cop and Beverly Hills Cop II, played by Paul Reiser), and Axel would have gone overseas after the gangsters' henchmen broke them out of custody and murdered Jeffrey. This was scrapped because producers Don Simpson and Jerry Bruckheimer decided it was too close to the story of Michael Douglas' 1989 film Black Rain.

When writer Steven E. de Souza was brought in, he originally wrote the story as more "Die Hard in a theme park". He was told that each of the rides he had designed would cost about $10 million to build and the whole film would cost about $70 million. When box office results for Murphy's 1992 comedy The Distinguished Gentleman came in, Paramount ordered the budget to be cut to $55 million. Paramount had earlier told Simpson and Bruckheimer that they would only outlay $25 million for a proposed version to be set in New York City, one of the main reasons that the producing team parted ways with the studio. Joel Silver was set to take over producing duties from Simpson and Bruckheimer; however, negotiations on a large budget resulted in production delays leading to Silver quitting production. It was at this time that producers Mace Neufeld and Robert Rehme took on the project. Consequently, the film became more about the investigation and less about the action.

Production was temporarily shut down to allow the Paramount top brass the chance to get to grips with the film's spiraling budget. Originally estimated at $55 million, it was soon in excess of $70 million. Of that budget, $15 million was Murphy's paycheck.

Filming
The final chase scene through the "Land of the Dinosaurs", featuring eleven animatronic dinosaurs, was filmed at Universal Studios Stage 37. Exterior scenes set in the theme park were filmed at Paramount's Great America (now known as California’s Great America) in Santa Clara, California, after Knott's Berry Farm declined permission. The three-armed Ferris wheel rescue scene used Great America's Sky Whirl. One shootout sequence was filmed inside the Earthquake! ride at the Universal Studios theme park. The Sherman Brothers wrote the WonderWorld theme song.

Music

Soundtrack

A soundtrack containing mostly R&B music was released on May 10, 1994, by MCA Records. It peaked at 158 on the Billboard 200 and 66 on the Top R&B/Hip-Hop Albums. While Harold Faltermeyer did not return to score this film, his co-producer from the previous franchise entries, Keith Forsey, did produce and co-write a new song entitled "Keep the Peace", performed by INXS. However, Nile Rodgers covered Faltermeyer's "Axel F" in a breakbeat hardcore version.

This is the only film in the series not to feature a song performed by The Pointer Sisters, although "Neutron Dance" was used in the film's trailer. Beverly Hills Cop featured their song "Neutron Dance", while Beverly Hills Cop II had their song "Be There".

Reception

Critical response
Beverly Hills Cop III was criticized harshly and currently holds an 11% rating on Rotten Tomatoes based on 56 reviews. The critical consensus reads; "Despite being set at an amusement park, Beverly Hills Cop III forgets to have any fun as it churns out uninspired violence and witless gags, with an uncharacteristically lethargic Eddie Murphy not helping matters." Metacritic, which assigns a normalized score, rated it 16/100 based on 15 reviews, indicating "overwhelming dislike". Richard Natale of Variety called it "a return to form by Eddie Murphy" that "runs out of steam before the end". Caryn James of The New York Times wrote that the film is designed to be a foolproof and safe money-maker, but Murphy plays Foley too straight. Owen Gleiberman of Entertainment Weekly rated it D- and called Murphy's performance "joyless" and "depressing".

Beverly Hills Cop III was nominated for two Golden Raspberry Awards, for Landis as Worst Director and the film as Worst Remake or Sequel.

Year-end lists
 4th worst – Robert Denerstein, Rocky Mountain News
 Top 10 worst (not ranked) – Dan Webster, The Spokesman-Review
 Top 12 worst (Alphabetically ordered, not ranked) – David Elliott, The San Diego Union-Tribune
Dishonorable mention – Glenn Lovell, San Jose Mercury News
 Dishonorable mention – Dan Craft, The Pantagraph

Crew comments
In an interview in 1994, Eddie Murphy said that Beverly Hills Cop III is "different from the trilogy's first installment because Axel is more mature and no longer the wisecracking rookie cop." During that same year, Murphy said he thought Beverly Hills Cop III was "infinitely better than Beverly Hills Cop II."

About the experience on making the movie, John Landis said:"Cop 3 was a very strange experience. The script wasn't any good, but I figured, “So what? I'll make it funny with Eddie". But then I discovered on the first day when I started giving Eddie some shtick, he said, "You know, John… Axel Foley is an adult now. He's not a wiseass anymore". So, with Beverly Hills Cop 3, I had this strange experience where he was very professional, but he just wasn't funny. I would try to put him in funny situations, and he would find a way to step around them. It's an odd movie. There are things in it I like, but it's an odd movie."

In an interview with The A.V. Club in 2009, Bronson Pinchot claimed that Eddie Murphy "was really depressed" at the time Beverly Hills Cop III was being filmed, claiming that Murphy was low-spirited and had a low energy level.

Sequel

A fourth entry in the series was initially announced for release in the mid-1990s, under the production of Eddie Murphy's own production company "Eddie Murphy Productions", though production later fizzled out. It was re-announced in 2006, when producer Jerry Bruckheimer announced his intention to resurrect the film series, though he eventually gave up his option to produce the film, instead passing production duties to Lorenzo di Bonaventura. In September 2006 a script, an amalgamation of several earlier drafts, was presented to Murphy who was reported to be "very happy" with the outline which was described as an attempt to recapture the "feel of the original". Murphy admitted one of his motivations for making a fourth Beverly Hills Cop film was to make up for the fact that the third film was "horrible" and that "he didn't want to leave (the series) like that".

In May 2008, Rush Hour director Brett Ratner was officially named director, who promised the film would return under the series' standard "R" rating, rather than as a rumored watered down PG-13. Michael Brandt and Derek Haas were hired as screenwriters to improve on the existing script in July 2008 and completed a new script, under the working title Beverly Hills Cop 2009, which would see Foley return to Beverly Hills to investigate the murder of his friend Billy Rosewood. The script was eventually rejected, leaving Ratner to work on a new idea. In an interview with Empire magazine, Ratner stated "I'm working very hard on the fourth. It's very difficult, especially since there were three before. We're trying to figure out some important things, like where do we start? Is Axel retired? Is he in Beverly Hills? Is he on vacation? Does Judge Reinhold return as the loveable Billy Rosewood? Many questions to figure out, but I'm hoping to have a script before film disappears from our existence." Although Murphy himself committed to the project, it was unconfirmed whether the series' other principal actors, Judge Reinhold, John Ashton, Ronny Cox or Bronson Pinchot would also return, though Ratner stated in late 2009 that he was trying to convince Reinhold and Ashton to reprise their roles. Harold Faltermeyer's "Axel F", however, would definitely be returning for the proposed fourth installment, with Ratner quoted as saying "It'll be back but it'll be a whole new interpretation." On November 15, 2010, Ratner stated in an interview with MTV that there was still a possibility that they will make a fourth film, but that it wouldn't be "anytime soon."

In October 2011, Murphy discussed a possible fourth film, stating, "They're not doing it. What I'm trying to do now is produce a TV show starring Axel Foley's son, and Axel is the chief of police now in Detroit. I'd do the pilot, show up here and there. None of the movie scripts were right; it was trying to force the premise. If you have to force something, you shouldn't be doing it. It was always a rehash of the old thing. It was always wrong."

During late Summer 2013, after CBS decided to pass on the TV series, Paramount decided to move forward with the fourth film. On September 13, 2013, Jerry Bruckheimer stated he was in talks to produce. On December 6, 2013, it was announced that Eddie Murphy would again reprise the role of Axel Foley and Brett Ratner would direct. On May 2, 2014, Deadline announced that screenwriters Josh Appelbaum and Andre Nemec would be penning the screenplay.

On June 27, 2014, in an interview with Rolling Stone, Murphy discussed returning to the edgier type character of Axel Foley after years of making family-friendly films. "I haven't done a street guy, working class, blue-collar character in ages so maybe it's like, 'Oh, wow, I didn't remember he was able to do that'", Murphy said. According to studio reports on the film's plot, Foley returns to Detroit after leaving his job in Beverly Hills and he's faced with the coldest winter on record to navigate the new rules and old enemies of one of America's most tenacious cities. The state of Michigan approved $13.5 million in film incentives, based on an estimated $56.6 million of filmmaker spending in the state. The film was supposed to be shot in and around Detroit and was estimated to provide jobs for 352 workers. The film was originally scheduled for a March 25, 2016 release, but on May 6, 2015, Paramount Pictures pulled Beverly Hills Cop IV from its release schedule, due to script concerns.

On October 1, 2019, in an interview with Collider, Murphy confirmed that production on Beverly Hills Cop IV will commence once the filming of Coming 2 America has wrapped. On November 14, 2019, Deadline Hollywood announced that Paramount Pictures made a one-time license deal with an option for a sequel to Netflix to create the fourth film. By May 2020, after delays in the filmmaking business caused by the COVID-19 pandemic, Arbi and Fallah confirmed they are still attached as co-directors and that a new screenwriter was working on a new script for the film. In April 2022, Arbi and Fallah left the film to focus on Batgirl (2022), with Mark Molloy hired to replace them. In the same article, Will Beall was announced to have penned the script. The film was retitled Beverly Hills Cop: Axel Foley, with filming commencing on August 29, 2022.

References

External links

 
 
 
 

Beverly Hills Cop (franchise)
1994 films
1990s English-language films
1994 action comedy films
1990s police comedy films
American action comedy films
American crime comedy films
American sequel films
California's Great America
Counterfeit money in film
Fictional portrayals of the Detroit Police Department
Films directed by John Landis
Films produced by Mace Neufeld
Films set in amusement parks
Films set in Beverly Hills, California
Films set in Detroit
Films set in Los Angeles
Films set in Michigan
Films shot in Los Angeles
Films shot in Michigan
Paramount Pictures films
Films shot in Detroit
1990s buddy cop films
1994 comedy films
Films with screenplays by Steven E. de Souza
1990s American films
African-American films